Ferenc Sas (16 August 1915 – 3 September 1988), born as Ferenc Sohn, in Argentina known as Francisco "Sas" Sohn, was a Hungarian football player. With the Hungary he played in the final of the World Cup 1938. With Hungária MTK FC and CA Boca Juniors he won national championships.

Life 

Ferenc Sas was born as the son of Leopold, who fell in World War I, and Roza Sohn. His parents were Jewish. He later hungarised his name, selecting "Sas", the Hungarian word for "Eagle", in order to get easier access to the Hungarian national team.

The right winger debuted in 1934 with Hungária FC, today's MTK Budapest. He impressed with his speed and technical abilities, one-on-ones were not his strength. He played in the front row alongside Pál Titkos and the Austrian Heinrich "Wudi" Müller in the team coached by Alfréd Schaffer that won the Hungarian Championships of 1936 and 1937.

In April 1936 Sas played for the first time for the national team, alongside Jenö Vincze on the right outfield, defeating Austria 5–3. A few days later in a match against Ireland he scores his first goal for the Magyars. Sas remained part of the Hungarian standard formation for the next two years.

In 1937 he was part of a Central-European selection that played in Amsterdam against a Western-European XI. In this match, which was organised by FIFA, he contributed with assists from György Sárosi and Italy's Silvio Piola two goals to the 3:1 victory of his side.

In 1938 he participated with Hungary at the World Cup in France. After 6-0 and 2-0 wins against Dutch East Indies (today's Indonesia) and Switzerland, Hungary, coached by Alfréd Schaffer, defeated Sweden in the semi-final 5–1. Despite of the support of the majority of the crowd, in the final Hungary had little chance against Italy, led by Giuseppe Meazza and Silvio Piola, arguably two of the greatest players of the era, and lost 2–4.

After the World Cup he migrated to Argentina. In December 1938 he debuted in a friendly for CA Boca Juniors. In the ensuing season he played 24 matches for the Juniors, scoring 9 goals, sharing the club's top scorer honours with two other players. The following season, he won the championship of Argentina. Sas, now called Francisco Sohn, however faced strong competition within the team and only played four league matches in that season. A friendly in March 1941 was his last match for Boca Juniors.

From the beginning of 1943 he played for three seasons in the second division with Argentinos Juniors. There he scored 12 goals in 72 matches. He continued to play at amateur level with Macabi, where he also coached. He also coached at the Colegio David Wolfsohn.

In Argentina he married his fiancé who followed him from Hungary with whom he shared a son and three grandchildren. In later years he worked for the renown clothing store Raitor, cinemas and a jeweller's store.

References

External links
 Ferenc Sas (Sohn), EU-Football (List of international matches of Ferenc Sas)
 Sas, Ferenc Sohn - Trayectoria y Biobrafia , Historia de Boca, (all matches of Ferenc Sohn Sas for CABJ)
 Javier Roimiser: Un Húngaro en Argentinos Juniors, Te Acordás Bicho?, 14.9.2010

1915 births
1988 deaths
Hungarian footballers
Hungary international footballers
Footballers from Budapest
Jewish footballers
Jewish Hungarian sportspeople
MTK Budapest FC players
Boca Juniors footballers
Argentinos Juniors footballers
Argentine Primera División players
Hungarian football managers
Hungarian expatriate footballers
Expatriate footballers in Argentina
1938 FIFA World Cup players
Association football midfielders
Hungarian expatriate sportspeople in Argentina